A metalloendopeptidase is an enzyme that functions as a metalloproteinase endopeptidase.

References

External links 
 

EC 3.4.24